Wild Tales is the second solo studio album by British singer-songwriter Graham Nash, released on Atlantic Records in 1974. In the United States, it peaked at number 34 on Billboards albums chart. Nash blamed its failure to chart higher there on a lack of support and promotion from Atlantic Records. Following the protracted break-up of Crosby, Stills, Nash & Young in late 1974 and early 1975, Nash left the label and signed a contract with ABC Records as a duo with his CSNY partner David Crosby.

Contrary to later reports, the darker tone of Wild Tales was not inspired by the murder of Nash's then-girlfriend, Amy Gossage, by her brother – an event that occurred in February 1975. Rather, Nash was in a sombre mood in the wake of the failures of his earlier relationships with Joni Mitchell and Rita Coolidge, and the unwillingness at the time of the other members of Crosby, Stills, Nash & Young to reunite for a new album.

Track listing
All tracks are written by Graham Nash.

Side one
 "Wild Tales" – 2:18
 "Hey You (Looking at the Moon)" – 2:14
 "Prison Song" – 3:10
 "You'll Never Be the Same" – 2:48
 "And So It Goes" – 4:48

Side two
 "Grave Concern" – 2:45
 "Oh! Camil (The Winter Soldier)" – 2:51
 "I Miss You" – 3:04
 "On the Line" – 2:35
 "Another Sleep Song" – 4:43

Personnel
Note: in the track number references, i is side one and ii is side two.
Graham Nash – acoustic guitar (i.4, ii.2), electric rhythm guitar (i.1, i.2, ii.1), electric piano (i.3, ii.5), piano (ii.3, ii.4), harmonica (i.3, ii.2, ii.4), vocals
John Barbata – drums
Joel Bernstein – acoustic guitar (i.2, ii.5)
David Crosby – vocals (i.3, i.5, ii.4)
Tim Drummond – bass guitar
Harry Halex (a pseudonym for Stephen Stills) – electric piano (i.5), acoustic guitar (ii.4)
Stanley Johnston – voice montage (ii.1)
Ben Keith – pedal steel guitar (i.2, i.4, i.5, ii.4), Dobro (ii.5)
David Lindley – electric slide guitar (i.1, ii.1), mandolin (i.3)
Dave Mason – twelve-string guitar (ii.2)
Joni Mitchell – vocals (ii.5)
Joe Yankee (a pseudonym for Neil Young) – acoustic piano (i.5)

Charts

References

1974 albums
Albums produced by Graham Nash
Atlantic Records albums
Graham Nash albums